

Hincks is a locality in the Australian state  of South Australia located on the Eyre Peninsula about  west of the state capital of  Adelaide.

Its name and boundaries were both adopted and created in 1998.  Its name is derived from both the Hundred of Hincks in which it is partly located and the Hincks Conservation Park which covered its full extent in 1998.  As of 2004, the full extent of Hincks is covered by the protected area known as the Hincks Wilderness Protection Area.

The 2016 Australian census which was conducted in August 2016 reports that Hincks had no people living within its boundaries.

Hincks is located within the federal division of Grey, the state electoral district of Flinders and the local government areas of the District Council of Cleve and the District Council of Tumby Bay.

See also
List of cities and towns in South Australia

References

 

Towns in South Australia
Eyre Peninsula